Cobb: Off The Leash is a comic book mini-series created by Beau Smith and Eduardo Barreto, published by IDW Publishing in 2006. The eponymous protagonist, Frank Cobb, is an original creation for this mini-series.

Plot summary
In the story, Frank Cobb is a former Secret Service agent who is lacking in direction as well as an outlet for his protective instincts. After an innocent is threatened, he has a violent confrontation with the aggressors and ends up in a jail cell. Soon, he is given a chance to forge a new direction. This new direction puts him in direct conflict with secret agents, members of the Mafia, and terrorists. Also involved in the story are old friends and beautiful women.

External links
 Grand Comics Database Project entry
 IDW Internet preview of Cobb : Off the Leash

Reviews
 Popmatters.com
 BrokenFrontier.com
 The Fourth Rail
 Chud.com
 Scoop